Elektro is a robot built by the Westinghouse Electric Corporation in its Mansfield, Ohio, facility between 1937 and 1938.  Seven feet tall (2.1 m), weighing 265 pounds (120.2 kg), humanoid in appearance, he could walk by voice command, speak about 700 words (using a 78-rpm record player), smoke cigarettes, blow up balloons, and move his head and arms. Elektro's body consisted of a steel gear, cam and motor skeleton covered by an aluminum skin. His photoelectric "eyes" could distinguish red and green light. He was on exhibit at the 1939 New York World's Fair and reappeared at that fair in 1940, with "Sparko", a robot dog that could bark, sit, and beg to humans.

Several minutes of color sound footage of Elektro in action can be seen at 33:55 in the movie, "The Middleton Family at the New York World's Fair", a fully-produced hour-long movie made by Westinghouse, which showcased the Westinghouse pavilion.

History
Elektro toured North America in 1950 in promotional appearances for Westinghouse, and was displayed at Pacific Ocean Park in Venice, California in the late 1950s and early 1960s. He also appeared as "Thinko", in Sex Kittens Go to College (1960). In the 1960s, his head was given to Harold Gorsuch, a retiring Westinghouse engineer.

Elektro and Sparko both appear as minor characters in the novel "Mr. Atom" (1969) by Theodore Pratt. The two join fellow machines in an attempt to go on strike and overthrow humans.

Elektro, renamed Gernsback, was featured in DC Comics' All-Star Squadron, the Squadron used the Perisphere as their headquarters and salvaged him to serve as their butler.

In 1992, the dance band Meat Beat Manifesto produced the song "Original Control (Version 2)" which prominently featured snippets of Elektro's monologues, quoting lines such as "I am Elektro" and "My brain is bigger than yours".

Elektro is currently the property of the Mansfield Memorial Museum. In 2013, a replica was exhibited at The Henry Ford Museum in Dearborn, Michigan.

Sparko's fate is unknown.

References

External links
Elektro commentary
YouTube Video footage of Elektro at the 1939 World's Fair
The Middleton Family at the New York World's Fair (1939) Shows entire Elektro demo starting at 34 minutes into movie.
Mansfield Memorial Museum

Historical robots
Mansfield, Ohio
1939 New York World's Fair
Humanoid robots
1937 robots
Robots of the United States